Deenanath Mangeshkar Hospital is a large hospital in Pune, India spread over  with over 900 beds. It is named after the Marathi theatre actor, Natya Sangeet musician and exceptional Hindustani classical vocalist Deenanath Mangeshkar. The first human milk bank in Pune was established at this hospital.

History
The Lata Mangeshkar foundation was established in Oct. 1989, by the Mangeshkar family of Indian musicians. The foundation was allotted a land of six acres by Govt. of Maharashtra for the proposed hospital. The foundation collaborated with the Jnana Prabodhini Medical Trust to erect the hospital. The hospital started functioning on 1 November 2001.

Facilities
It has all the ultra modern facilities including blood bank, cancer research centre etc. The hospital has more than 65 ICU beds with a central monitoring system. The hospital has a well equipped air-conditioned auditorium (with a capacity of 3000 people), advanced sound system and a sophisticated video projection system too.

Awareness programs
The hospital conducts lot of awareness programs and makes films for the people and society like the films on diabetes etc.

References

External links
 

Hospital buildings completed in 2001
Hospitals in Pune
Hospitals established in 2001
2001 establishments in Maharashtra